Radanović (Cyrillic script: Радановић) is surname derived from a masculine given name Radan. It may refer to:

Dejana Radanović (born 1996), Serbian tennis player
Ljubomir Radanović (born 1960), football defender
Miloš Radanović (born 1980), football goalkeeper
Siniša Radanović (born 1979), football defender
Željka Radanović (born 1989), footballer

See also
George Radanovich, politician from California
Radanovići (disambiguation)

Serbian surnames
Patronymic surnames
Surnames from given names